CF Ungheni (also named FC Ungheni) is a Moldovan football club from Ungheni. The club was founded in 2012 and most recently played in the Divizia A, the second tier of Moldovan football. It previously spent one season in the Divizia Națională, the top division.

Honours
Divizia B
 Winners (1): 2014–15

List of seasons

References

External links

Profile at Soccerway
Profile at divizia-a.md
Profile at Facebook

Football clubs in Moldova
Association football clubs established in 2012
2012 establishments in Moldova